Sir Arthur Wheeler, 1st Baronet (18 September 1860 – 20 May 1943) was an English stockbroker and financier.

Wheeler was born in Nottingham. He was educated at Nottingham High School and joined Simon, Meyer & Co, a lace exporter, as a clerk. He rose to be chief clerk and in 1899 launched his own stockbroking firm in Leicester, concentrating on serving Midlands firms which were too small to launch themselves in the City of London.

During the First World War, Wheeler dedicated his energies to selling war bonds, and for this he was created a baronet in the 1920 New Year Honours. He was ruined by the Depression, was declared bankrupt, and in 1931 was jailed for twelve months for fraud. After his release he retired from business.

Footnotes

References
Biography, Oxford Dictionary of National Biography
Kidd, Charles, Williamson, David (editors). Debrett's Peerage and Baronetage (1990 edition). New York: St Martin's Press, 1990.

1860 births
1943 deaths
People from Nottingham
Baronets in the Baronetage of the United Kingdom
English fraudsters
English stockbrokers